Nketoana Local Municipality is an administrative area in the Thabo Mofutsanyane District of the Free State in South Africa.

Main places
The 2001 census divided the municipality into the following main places:

Politics 

The municipal council consists of eighteen members elected by mixed-member proportional representation. Nine councillors are elected by first-past-the-post voting in nine wards, while the remaining nine are chosen from party lists so that the total number of party representatives is proportional to the number of votes received. In the 2021 South African municipal elections the African National Congress (ANC) won a reduced majority of ten seats on the council.

The following table shows the results of the 2021 election.

References

External links
 https://web.archive.org/web/20130115051832/http://www.nketoana.gov.za/

Local municipalities of the Thabo Mofutsanyane District Municipality